OPV-64 is a type of offshore patrol vessel based on a Leroux & Lotz patrol vessel concept and designed for the needs of the Royal Moroccan Navy, ordered in late 1993.

Definition of the requirements
The main propulsion systems are two Wartsila Nohab 16V25 diesel engines with  power produced. A secondary propulsion system is fitted separately from the main engines and used for economic mode or emergencies. The main mission is the surveillance of Moroccan exclusive economic zone and control of fisheries in the Atlantic Ocean, with secondary roles including detecting illegal immigration, smuggling and drug trafficking and supporting counter terrorism and search and rescue patrols along Moroccan coasts.

Equipment
The armament was recycled from decommissioned warships and from Royal Moroccan Army's inventory, later added after reception of the ships between 1995 and 1997 in Moroccan naval bases.

Original armament:
 2 x 20 mm

Added after reception:
 1 x Bofors 40 mm
 4 x (2 twin) KPV 14.5 mm
 1 x Oerlikon 20 mm

Ships

References

Patrol vessels of Morocco
Patrol boat classes
Ships built in France